Corey Woods may refer to:

Corey Woods (mayor), American mayor of Tempe, Arizona
Corey Woods (born 1970), American rapper known by his stage name, Raekwon